Ben (trad. 賁, simp. 贲) is a Chinese surname meaning "bright, energetic". It is romanized Pên in Wade–Giles, or Ban in Cantonese romanization. According to a 2013 study, it was not one of the top 400 surnames in modern China. It is the 179th name on the Hundred Family Surnames poem.

Origins
Several origins are claimed for the surname:
from Xian Ben Fu (縣賁父) a carriage driver during the reign of Duke Zhuang of Lu (706–662 BC)
from Hu Ben (虎賁), an official post in charge of guarding the king or the royal palace
from the Ben Hun (賁渾), a minority ethnic group in ancient western China

References

Individual Chinese surnames